The following is the list of squads for the teams competing in the 2018 Wheelchair Basketball World Championship (Rollstuhlbasketball Weltmeisterschaft 2018), held in Hamburg, Germany, between 16 and 26 August 2018. Each team selected a squad of 12 players for the tournament.

Athletes are given an eight-level-score specific to wheelchair basketball, ranging from 0.5 to 4.5. Lower scores represent a higher degree of disability. The sum score of all players on the court cannot exceed 14.

Women

Pool A

Head coach: David Gould
Assistant coaches: Stephen Charlton and Craig Campbell

Head coach: Miles ThompsonAssistant coach: Dan Price

Head coach: Cristiane Bonilha Borreggio Antonelli

Head coach: Gertjan van der LindenAssistant coach: Irene Sloof

Head coach: Marc-Anotine DucharmeAssistant coaches: Jason Eng and Simon Cass

Head coach: Adrian GarciaAssistant coach: David Benitez

Source:

Pool B

Head coach: Djawed Zigh Assistant Coach: Ahmed Taguiche

Head coach: Pascal MontetAssistant Coach: Carolina Vincenzoni

Head coach: Carlos Ariel CardelliAssistant coach: Cesar Manuel Cairo

Head coach: Martin OttoAssistant coach: Janet McLachlan

Head coach: Tiehua Liu

Head coach: Trooper JohnsonAssistant coaches: Adam Kramer and Amy Spangler

Men

Pool A

Head coach: Matteo FerianiAssistant coach: Joey Johnson

Head coach: Nicholai ZeltingerAssistant coach: Martin Kluck

Head coach: Nicholai ZeltingerAssistant coach: Martin Kluck

Head coach: Rafael Ubaldo

Pool B

Head coach:Haj BhaniaAssistant coach: Steve Caine

Head coach:Piotr LuszynskiAssistant coaches: Arkadluiz Chlebda and Wojciech Makowski

Head coach:Sa HyunAssistant coach: Young Moo

Head coach: Trooper JohnsonAssistant coaches: Adam Kramer and Amy Spangler

Pool C

Head coach: Tago Joel FrankCoaches: Tiago Costa Baptista and Sileno Santos

Head coach: Carlo di GiustoAssistant Coaches: Roberto Ceriscioli and Fabio Castellucci

Head coach: Shimper OikawaAssistant Coach: Kazuyki Kyoya

Head coach: Can Aksu

Pool D

Head coach: Mauro VarelaAssistant coaches: Juna Dominguez, Lucas Barolin and Eduardo Gomez

Head coach: Craig FridayAssistant coaches: Brad Ness

Head coach: Cees van Rootselaar

Head coach: Oscar Trigo DiezAssistant coaches: Javier Opez Martinez, Miguel Aquero Maestre and Javier Alvajal Pichel

Source:

References

External links
Official site of the 2018 Wheelchair Basketball World Championships

2018 Wheelchair Basketball World Championship
Basketball squads